Marco Diener (29 May 1913 – 18 June 1965) was a French water polo player. He competed in the men's tournament at the 1948 Summer Olympics.

References

1913 births
1965 deaths
French male water polo players
Olympic water polo players of France
Water polo players at the 1948 Summer Olympics
Sportspeople from Colmar